The C1a Class were a type of 4-4-4 steam locomotive built for the Philadelphia and Reading Railway in 1915. Four locomotives were built, road numbers #110-113.  They used front and rear trucks that were effectively identical.  During a year of operation, they proved to be quite unstable; after that year, they were rebuilt to 4-4-2 "Atlantic" locomotives, reclassified as P7sa, and renumbered #350-353.
Steam locomotives of the United States
4-4-4 locomotives
Philadelphia and Reading Railroad locomotives
Railway locomotives introduced in 1915
Standard gauge locomotives of the United States